Stylianos Dimitriou (1887–1966) was a Greek athlete.  He competed in the 1908 Summer Olympics in London. He was born in Tripoli.

Dimitriou finished fourth in his semifinal heat of the 1500 metres and did not advance further. In the 800 metres, Dimitrios did not finish his semifinal heat and did not advance to the final in that event either.

References

Sources

External links

1887 births
1966 deaths
Athletes (track and field) at the 1908 Summer Olympics
Olympic athletes of Greece
Greek male middle-distance runners
Date of birth missing
Place of birth missing
Date of death missing
Place of death missing
Athletes from Tripoli, Greece